The 1998 Open 13 was a men's tennis tournament played on indoor hard courts at the Palais des Sports de Marseille in Marseille, France, that was part of the World Series of the 1998 ATP Tour. It was the sixth edition of the tournament and was held from 2 February to 9 February 1998. Sixth-seeded Thomas Enqvist won the singles title.

Finals

Singles

 Thomas Enqvist defeated  Yevgeny Kafelnikov 6–4, 6–1
 It was Enqvist's first title of the year and the 13th of his career.

Doubles

 Donald Johnson /  Francisco Montana defeated  Mark Keil /  T. J. Middleton 6–4, 3–6, 6–3
 It was Johnson's first title of the year and the fourth of his career. It was Montana's first title of the year and the seventh of his career.

References

External links
 Official website 
 ATP tournament profile
 ITF tournament edition details

Open 13
1998
1998 in France
Open 13